First lady is an unofficial title usually used for the wife, and occasionally used for the daughter or other female relative, of a non-monarchical head of state or chief executive. The term is also used to describe a woman seen to be at the top of her profession or art.

The title has also been used for the wife of a head of government who is not also head of state. It has also been used to refer to the wives of the leaders of administrative divisions within a country.

History

It has been noted that the earliest use of the term "first lady" is in reference to person of a high ranking or outstanding person in their field, and that the term, as used to describe the spouse of the president of the United States, saw its first documented use in 1838 in reference to Martha Washington, who was never referred to as such during George Washington's time as president.

The first person to have been referred to as "first lady" on a regular basis during their time in the position was Harriet Lane, who was actually James Buchanan's niece, as Buchanan was a lifelong bachelor.

Variations

The male equivalent of the title in countries where the head of state's spouse has been a man, such as the Philippines or Malta, is first gentleman. While there has never been a male spouse of a U.S. president, "first gentleman" is used in the United States for the male spouse of a mayor or governor.

First spouse and first partner, both rare variations of the title, can be used in either case where the spouse of a political leader is of any gender. This term is used to promote gender equality and gender neutrality.

In the United States, collectively, the president of the United States and his spouse are known as the first couple and, if they have children, they are usually referred to as the first family.

Use in non-English speaking countries
French-speaking countries have used the term première dame for first ladies, regardless of where the first lady is from. At least one article, published in 2017, used the term premier monsieur for first gentleman. For that particular article, it was used to discuss the possibility of Louis Aliot becoming first gentleman, should his spouse, Marine Le Pen, win that year's presidential election. Emmanuel Macron defeated Le Pen in that year's election.

Portuguese-speaking countries have used the term primeira-dama or "Primeira Dama" for first ladies. The term is used regardless of where the person is from. The term primeiro-cavalheiro is used for first gentlemen.

In Spanish-speaking countries, the term primera dama is used for first ladies, regardless of the country the person is from. The term primer caballero has been used for first gentlemen.

Sinophone countries have used the term 第一夫人 (dìyī fūrén) as a term for first ladies, also without regards as to where the first lady is from.

Europe

Croatia
The terms supruga predsjednika republike (wife of the president of the republic) or suprug predsjednice republike (husband of the president of the republic) are most commonly used in Croatia, while the terms prva dama (first lady) and prvi gospodin (first gentleman) are rarely used, except by foreign sources. The current wife of the president of Croatia is Sanja Musić-Milanović.

The wife of the prime minister has occasionally, in exceptionally rare cases, also been referred to as the "first lady" of Croatia, however as the spouses of prime ministers have often maintained a low profile and have almost never been public figures, the title supruga predsjednika vlade (wife of the prime minister) has been used in cases when such a reference is needed. The current wife of the prime minister is Ana Maslać Plenković.

Czech Republic
The term první dáma is used for wife of the president of the Czech Republic.

The current first lady is Eva Pavlová.

The term první dáma is also used for first ladies of other countries.

Poland
The term pierwsza dama (literal meaning: "first lady") is used by the wife of the current president of Poland.  The title pani prezydentowa (the presidential lady) is also commonly, though informally, used.

Russia
Foreign press reports have referred to the wife of the Russian president as first lady. The term has also been used by foreign press to refer to the wife of Alexei Navalny, Yulia Navalnaya.

Russian first ladies have been less visible than their western counterparts due to historical reasons, as explained below.

Soviet Union
It has been noted that Soviet leaders generally preferred to keep their wives and families out of the spotlight, resulting in "invisible first ladies". As a result, low-profile first ladies remain common in post-Soviet countries, due to the leaders of those countries having grown up during the Soviet era.

The wife of Mikhail Gorbachev, Raisa Gorbachev, has been referred to as a Soviet first lady.

Ukraine
The wife of the country's president has been referred to as перша леді (persha ledi) by the country's government. The term "first lady" has also been used by the government in English language news releases.

While some first ladies, like Marina Poroshenko and Olena Zelenska, have played a role in social activism, other first ladies, like Lyudmila Yanukovych, have rarely taken part in public roles.

Nazi Germany 

Nazi Germany did not have an official title of "First Lady". Unofficially, however, there was a fierce competition between Eva Braun, Adolf Hitler's mistress, and Emmy Göring, Hermann Göring's wife, both of whom aspired to be considered as such.

Asia

Armenia
The wife of the president of Armenia has been referred to as "Հայաստանի Առաջին տիկին" (Hayastani Arrajin tikin). The term "first lady" has also been used. The spouse of the current president, however, is only referred to as "հանրապետության նախագահի տիկին" (hanrapetut'yan nakhagahi tikin), or "wife of the president of Armenia".

Azerbaijan
The wife of the current president of Azerbaijan uses the term birinci xanım.

India

The term pratham mahila (प्रथम महिला, literally meaning "first lady") is less frequently used in India. The term might be used at times to refer to the wife of the president of India in newspapers; however, the more widespread term in general use is "wife of the president" or more informally as the president's wife/spouse/husband.  the term "first lady" is not used to refer to the wife of the prime minister. Instead the term "first spouse" is used for the spouse of PM of India.

Indonesia
The term ibu negara (lady/mother of the state) is used for wife of the president of Indonesia. The term is also used to refer to first ladies of other countries.

Japan 
In Japan, the term Naikaku Souri Daijin Fujin (内閣総理大臣夫人, literally "the wife of the Minister of the Comprehensive Administration of the Cabinet") is the title used for the wife of the prime minister of Japan.

Pakistan
In Pakistan, the term خاتون اول (read as khatoon-e-awwal) is commonly used for the wife of Mohammad, Khadija Bint Al-Khuwaylid. It has also been used for wife of the prime minister of Pakistan. It has also been used for wife of the president of Pakistan.

Philippines
The consort of the president of the Philippines bears the gender-neutral title of first spouse (Filipino: unang kabiyák), and among other duties, is host of Malacañan Palace. The title is genderless as many Philippine languages lack grammatical gender, and because there have been presidential consorts of both sexes.

When the official consort is female, she is known as "first lady" (unang ginang); the title has also been applied to an immediate female relative serving in this capacity for a widowed president. There has only been one first gentleman (unang ginoó) in history: José Miguel Arroyo, the husband of Gloria Macapagal Arroyo, the 14th president, but always given title "excellency".

South Korea
The wife of the president is called yeong-bu-in (영부인/令夫人).

Vietnam 
Currently, the spouse of the President of Vietnam is called phu nhân chủ tịch nước (lit: wife of the state president). The term đệ nhất phu nhân (lit: first lady) is also unofficially used by the press and on social media.

Non-spousal uses
In some situations, the title is bestowed upon a non-spouse.

Australia
Following the leadership spill which installed Julia Gillard as the first female prime minister of Australia on June 24, 2010, some news media referred to her partner, Tim Mathieson, as the "first bloke". The Australian Government has referred to Mathieson as Gillard's partner, and has also recognized him as a prime ministerial spouse.

Bolivia
Evo Morales, the former president of Bolivia, is single, so during his presidency his sister, Esther Morales, fulfilled the role of first lady.

Chile
Irina Karamanos, the domestic partner and girlfriend of Gabriel Boric, accepted the title of first lady despite both Karamanos and Boric's initial opposition to the position's existence. Karamanos said that taking on the role would involve "adapting it to the times."

Ireland
During the first half of Bertie Ahern's term as Taoiseach, he was separated from his wife Miriam (née Kelly) and the role of first lady was filled by his then domestic partner, Celia Larkin.

Republic of Korea (South Korea)
During the last five years of Park Chung-hee's time as president, his daughter, Park Geun-hye, served as first lady following her mother, Yuk Young-soo's death. She has been regarded as a de facto first lady of South Korea by some modern sources.

Peru
Keiko Fujimori took over the duties of first lady at the age of 19, after the divorce of her father Alberto Fujimori and her mother Susana Higuchi.

Philippines
The title was officially bestowed on Victoria Quirino-Delgado, the daughter of widower Elpidio Quirino (1948–1953), sixth president of the Philippines. Victoria's mother, Alicia Quirino née Syquía, had been killed by occupying Japanese troops towards the end of the Second World War. While President Corazón Aquino (1986–1992) was also widowed, the title was not given to her older children who would assist her in official duties. These included her son (and later president) Benigno Aquino III, who was a sort of de facto first gentleman; his four sisters, as under their mother's presidency, now unofficially share the duties of the first lady or gentlemen. The former president, Rodrigo Duterte's marriage was annulled, and his common-law wife was not designated as first lady.

United States

Thomas Jefferson was a widower by the time he took office as president, and his daughter, Martha Jefferson Randolph, who served as the lady of the president's house on occasion, has been recognized by the First Ladies National Historic Site as being a first lady, even though the White House website recognizes her mother, Martha Jefferson, as first lady. While Dolley Madison also served as hostess and Jefferson's escort on occasion, she is recognized as a spousal first lady by way of her husband's presidency following Jefferson.

Andrew Jackson's wife, Rachel Jackson, died before Jackson's presidency. Jackson's niece, Emily Donelson, carried out the duties of first lady until her death, and Jackson's daughter-in-law, Sarah Jackson, presided over the White House during the final months of Jackson's presidency. Both are recognized by the First Ladies National Historic Site as being first ladies, despite the White House website recognizing Jackson's wife as first lady.

James Buchanan was a lifelong bachelor. During his time in office, his niece, Harriet Lane, served as "hostess". She is recognized as having acted in the capacity of a contemporary first lady during her uncle's time in office, and is listed among other spousal first ladies on the White House website.

Colorado
Jared Polis, who was elected as governor in 2018, is openly gay, and was in a long-term relationship with his partner, Marlon Reis, at the time of his election. Reis was referred to as "first man" by Polis during a speech on the night of his election, and members of Polis' campaign said that Reis will take on the title of "first gentleman". The pair subsequently married in 2021.

Not all non-married partners of Colorado governors are called first lady or first gentleman, as Robin Pringle was referred to by The Denver Post as John Hickenlooper's girlfriend prior to their marriage.

Puerto Rico
After taking office as Puerto Rico's first female governor, Governor Sila María Calderón appointed her two daughters, Sila María González Calderón and María Elena González Calderón, to serve as first ladies.

Non-political uses
It has become commonplace in the United States for the title of "first lady" to be bestowed on women, as a term of endearment, who have proven themselves to be of exceptional talent or unique notoriety in non-political areas. The phrase is often, but not always, used when the person in question is either the wife or "female equivalent" of a well-known man (or men) in a similar field. For example, the term has been applied in the entertainment field to denote the "first lady of television" (Lucille Ball), the "first lady of song" (Ella Fitzgerald), the "first lady of country music" (Tammy Wynette, although Loretta Lynn was also known by the title), the "first lady of Star Trek" (actor/producer Majel Barrett), the "first lady of American soul" (Aretha Franklin), the "first lady of the Grand Ole Opry" (Loretta Lynn), "the first lady of American cinema" (Lilian Gish) and the "first lady of the American stage" (Helen Hayes).

The term has also been used to refer to wives of college and university presidents in some cases.

The term "first lady" is also used to denote a woman who occupies the foremost social position within a particular locality, in this sense being particularly popular in Africa, where the pre-eminent female noble in some chieftaincy hierarchies, such as those of the Yoruba people, is often referred to by the title.

In recent years, the term has also been used to refer to the wife of the pastor of a church, especially in predominantly black churches.

See also
 List of spouses of heads of state
 List of spouses of heads of government
 List of first gentlemen in the United States
 List of spouses of national leaders born abroad
 Second lady
 Queen consort
 First Yaya [First Nanny] - Philippine TV series
 First Lady - Philippine TV series

References

Further reading

 Abrams, Jeanne E.  First Ladies of the Republic: Martha Washington, Abigail Adams, Dolley Madison, and the Creation of an Iconic American Role (NYU Press. 2018) online review
 Bailey, Tim. "America's First Ladies on Twentieth-Century Issues: A Common Core Unit", History Now 35 (Spring 2013) online , curriculum unit based on primary sources
 Berkin, Berkin, ed., "America's First Ladies", History Now 35 (Spring 2013) online ; popular essays by scholars
 Burns, Lisa M. (2008). First Ladies and the Fourth Estate: Press Framing of Presidential Wives. DeKalb: Northern Illinois University Press. 

 Horohoe, Jill, "First Ladies as Modern Celebrities: Politics and the Press in Progressive Era" (PhD dissertation, Arizona State University, 2011). DA3452884.
 Lugo-Lugo, Carmen R. and Mary K. Bloodsworth-Lugo. "Bare Biceps and American (In) Security: Post-9/11 Constructions of Safe(ty), Threat, and the First Black First Lady", Women's Studies Quarterly (2011) 39#1 pp 200–217, on media images of Michelle Obama
 Watson, Robert P. "Toward the Study of the First Lady: The State of Scholarship", Presidential Studies Quarterly (2003) 33#2 pp 423–441.

External links
 Current First Ladies (biographies and photo profiles)

 
Women's social titles